Eminiska (Ime an Uisce in Irish) is a townland in the Barony of Ormond Lower, County Tipperary, Ireland. Situated between Borrisokane and Cloughjordan,

Buildings of note
Eminiska House is a two-storey Georgian house listed as a protected structure by Tipperary County Council (RPS Ref S159).

Modreeny House, an Arts and Crafts style home built c 1920 and listed on the National Inventory of Architectural Heritage.

References

Townlands of County Tipperary